Anna-Karin Hatt (born 7 December 1972) is a Swedish corporate leader and former politician. Since 2015, she is the CEO of Almega, the employers’ organisation for the Swedish service sector. She is also a member of the board at Alecta, Ratio Institute and the publicly held real estate company Castellum.
She served as Minister for IT and Energy from 2011 to 2014, having previously served as Minister for IT and Regional Affairs from 2010 to 2011. She also served as the party's state secretary in the central coordination office of the Government of Sweden from 2006 to 2010.

Biography
Anna-Karin Hatt, born Andersson on 7 December 1972, and raised in Hylte municipality in Halland County, Sweden. She was from 1994 to 1998 part of the national board of the Center Party Youth League, and the 1995-1998 President of the Nordic Center Youth League. In the early 1990s Hatt studied political science, international relations and conflict and peace studies at the University of Gothenburg.

Hatt has been writing editorials in Hallands Nyheter and Södermanlands Nyheter in 1995 and became Permanent Secretary of the Center Party International Foundation. From 2000 she was Vice President of the Stockholm-based public relations agency Kind & Partners. She returned to politics in late 2003, when Maud Olofsson appointed her chief of staff for the Center Party, gave her a key role in the development of the Alliance election platform for the parliamentary election of 2006. During that time she assisted Maud Olofsson in writing the book Min dröm för Sverige, published in 2006 and Ett land av friherrinnor (2010).
During her time in office, she was the head of the Government's Digital Commission, responsible for creating A Digital Agenda for Sweden.

The magazine Focus designated her as Sweden's 23rd most powerful person in 2011. After being appointed Minister for IT and Regional Affairs, she was named as the most powerful woman within IT in Sweden by Computer Sweden.

Following the 2014 election defeat and her defeat from the Riksdag, Hatt announced that she will leave politics and step down as second deputy party leader in 2015.

Personal life
The magazine Focus designated her as Sweden's 95th most powerful person in 2008.

Hatt was married to Ola Alterå from 1996 to 2002 and was then married to Greger Hatt from 2009 to 2011 and och Pierre Sandberg 2019–2020. She has three children, born in 1997, 2002 and 2011. She lives in southern Stockholm. Between 2019 and 2021, her eldest daughter Ida Alterå was chairman of the Center Party Youth.

References

External links

1972 births
Living people
21st-century Swedish women politicians
Centre Party (Sweden) politicians
Women government ministers of Sweden